Shavertown is the name of a number of places in the United States: 

Shavertown, New York, extinct town in the Catskills region
Shavertown, Pennsylvania 
Shavertown, Virginia (part of Sterling, Virginia)